Kvennsjøen is a lake in the municipality of Ullensvang in Vestland county, Norway. The  lake lies on the Hardangervidda plateau, inside the Hardangervidda National Park. There are over 500 lakes in Ullensvang municipality and this one is the largest of all of them.

See also
List of lakes in Norway

References

Lakes of Vestland
Ullensvang